Joe Lauro is an American documentary filmmaker, musician and stock footage archivist. He is the CEO of Historic Films Archive, a commercial stock footage archive focusing on American music on film and video and rare American history and pop culture on film 1895–2000. He has directed and produced documentary films such as The Big Beat: Fats Domino, the Birth of Rock 'n' Roll and Rejoice and Shout.

Life and career
Lauro born in Brooklyn, New York. He studied film at New York University and began working for a film archive service in New York after graduation. In 1991, Lauro founded the Historic Films Archive, a stock footage library that contains over 40,000 hours of film and video which is derived from American Newsreels, Feature Films, Industrial shorts, home movies, out-takes, television programs and cartoons. Lauro turned to the filmmaking with a documentary film Louis Prima: The Wildest! In 1999. Lauro is known for his documentary films focused on American music themes. Apart from directing, he has also worked as a music consultant on films that required archival music such as the Grateful Dead documentary LONG STRANGE TRIP, Bob Dylan’s documentary NO DIRECTION HOME and others. In addition to performing with his own professional band, the Hoodoo Loungers, he was the host of the “Legends of Rock” series at Bay Street Theatre in Sag Harbor.

Filmography

As producer
 1999: Louis Prima: The Wildest!
 1999: Somewhere Over the Rainbow: Harold Arlen
 2003: The Howlin' Wolf Story
 2008: The Four Tops: Reach Out – Definitive Performances 1965–1973
 2009: The Supremes: Reflections – The Definitive Performances 1964 – 1969
 2009: I'm Rick James: The Definitive DVD
 2009: Motown: The DVD
 2009: The Panic Is On: The Great American Depression as Seen by the Common Man
 2010: Rejoice and Shout
 2010: Louis Prima: In Person!
 2016: American Masters

As director
 2008: Sam & Dave: The Original Soul Men
 2009: The Four Tops: Reach Out – Definitive Performances 1965–1973
 2009: The Supremes: Reflections – The Definitive Performances 1964 – 1969
 2009: I'm Rick James: The Definitive DVD
 2009: The Panic Is On: The Great American Depression as Seen by the Common Man
 2016: American Masters
 2016: The Big Beat: Fats Domino and the Birth of Rock 'n' Roll

Awards
Louis Prima : The Wildest Audience Award at the East Hampton Film Festival 2000
The Howling Wolf Story: Film Of The Year – National Blues Foundation (2003)
Historic Films archive – Archive of the year ( 2017 ) at the Focal International

References

Year of birth missing (living people)
Living people
American documentary filmmakers
American male musicians

New York University alumni